Desmodium sessilifolium, common name sessileleaf ticktrefoil, is a species of  plant in the legume family, Fabaceae. It is native to North America.

Conservation status
It is listed as endangered and extirpated in Maryland, endangered in New Jersey and Ohio, extirpated in Pennsylvania, and threatened in Rhode Island. It is a special concern and believed extirpated in Connecticut.

References

sessilifolium
Flora of North America
Taxa named by John Torrey
Taxa named by Moses Ashley Curtis
Taxa named by Asa Gray